Prince Alfred may refer to:

 Alfred, Duke of Saxe-Coburg and Gotha (1844–1900), second son and fourth child of Queen Victoria of the United Kingdom and Prince Albert
 Alfred, Hereditary Prince of Saxe-Coburg and Gotha (1874–1899), eldest child of Alfred, Duke of Saxe-Coburg and Gotha
 Alfred I, Prince of Windisch-Grätz (1787–1862), Austrian army officer
 Prince Alfred of Great Britain (1780–1783), fourteenth child of George III of the United Kingdom
 Prince Alfred, Maida Vale, London pub